Cyril Halliday (first ¼ 1898 – death unknown) was an English professional rugby league footballer who played in the 1920s and 1930s.

Background
Cyril Halliday was born in Elland, his birth was registered in Halifax district, West Riding of Yorkshire, England. As young amateur players Cyril and his pals used to visit the Malt Shovel pub in Elland for drink and wash in the stream that ran behind the pub.

After his retirement from Rugby League Cyril qualified as a masseur and a yoga practitioner.

Playing career

International honours
Cyril Halliday won a cap for England while at Huddersfield in 1931 against Wales.

Challenge Cup Final appearances
Cyril Halliday played  in Huddersfield's 21–17 victory over Warrington in the 1933 Challenge Cup Final during the 1932–33 season at Wembley Stadium, London on Saturday 6 May 1933, and played  in Keighley's 5–18 defeat by Widnes in the 1937 Challenge Cup Final during the 1936–37 season at Wembley Stadium, London on Saturday 8 May 1937, in front of a crowd of 47,699.

Genealogical information
Cyril Halliday's marriage to Lucy (née Stott) was registered during third ¼ 1923 in Halifax district. They had children; Fred Halliday (birth registered second ¼ 1924 in Halifax district), Margaret Halliday (birth registered third ¼ 1928 in Halifax district).   On Lucys' death Cyril married Hetty Sykes and lived in Fartown, Huddersfield.

References

External links

1898 births
England national rugby league team players
English rugby league players
Halifax R.L.F.C. players
Huddersfield Giants players
Keighley Cougars players
Place of death missing
Rugby league hookers
Rugby league players from Halifax, West Yorkshire
Year of death missing
Yorkshire rugby league team players